The Divine Comedy is the first studio album by American actress and model Milla Jovovich. She was billed as simply Milla for this release. The album is named after the work of Dante Alighieri.

Only one music video was produced for the album in 1994: "Gentleman Who Fell", it charted at number 21 on the Billboard Modern Rock Tracks chart. "Bang Your Head" and "It's Your Life" were released as the next singles.

Her 1998 studio album, The People Tree Sessions, was reportedly unauthorized, and Jovovich launched legal action in order for it to be taken off the market. In recent years, Milla has opted to release her new songs for free on her official website.  With these demos, she extends to all listeners the right to re-mix the songs, but reserves the right to sell the songs, preventing unauthorized resale of her material.

The Divine Comedy has been met with positive reception by critics.

Background and production

Milla Jovovich had begun working on a music album as early as 1988, when she was signed by SBK Records after the company heard a demo she recorded. Many of the songs were co-written by 1970s Australian pop star Mark Holden - best known currently as one of the judges on the talent show Australian Idol. Jovovich released the track "Gentleman Who Fell", with an accompanying music video, as the sole single from the album. The music video was originally directed by Lisa Bonet and featured Harry Dean Stanton, but Jovovich was unsatisfied with the results and decided to film another version. The second version of "Gentleman Who Fell", an homage to Maya Deren's short film Meshes of the Afternoon (1943), was subsequently played on MTV. Milla has also collaborated musically with longtime friend and musician Chris Brenner, who co-wrote with her on the Divine Comedy album and who was the musical coordinator for the supporting tour. She and Brenner met in 1993 and have been working creatively on different ventures ever since. Following The Divine Comedy, she expressed interest in releasing a second album, having had ten songs ready for a future recording that was intended for a summer 1996 release. However, Jovovich has yet to release a second album.

In the end, Richard G. Feldman was one of the two music producers of the album, with Rupert Hine being the other; Mark R. Holden, Richard Feldman, and Chris Brenner composed songs with Jovovich as writing-composing partner.

Music and lyrics

In August 1990, she asserted in an interview that the then-forthcoming album would be "a mix between Kate Bush, Sinéad O'Connor, This Mortal Coil, and the Cocteau Twins". After it was initially presented by SBK strictly as a pop album, Jovovich protested, insisting on using her personal poetry for lyrics and recording her own instrumental material. Jovovich had written the songs when she was fifteen, with the exception of a Ukrainian folk song, "In a Glade", that she covered. The album features pop-infused traditional Ukrainian folk songs that led to comparisons with musicians Tori Amos and Kate Bush. Slant Magazine said about the album: "The Divine Comedy remains one of the best kept musical secrets of the 90's. Acoustic, folky, and hard to categorize, Milla's music is similar to that of Kate Bush (who she cites as a major influence) and Sarah McLachlan. Her rich voice is coupled with seldom used instruments like the mandolin, dulcimer, and flute to create an oddly unique and airy sound. The final track, 'In a Glade', is a beautiful traditional Ukrainian folk song that Milla sings in her native tongue."

The songs in this collection are for the most part acoustic, and are inspired by Jovovich's Slavic background, as well as from other philosophical roots based on various authors and poets she enjoys. She also credited Kate Bush as a musical influence.

Release and promotion

Before the album's release, SBK Records released an EP called "Music from the forthcoming album "The Divine Comedy" featuring five songs from the album, they were: "Gentleman Who Fell", "It's Your Life", "Bang Your Head", "Clock" and the traditional song "In a Glade".
The album was released in 1994 during April 5 and 8 in CD edition. Jovovich toured the United States during most of 1994 to promote the album, opening for Toad the Wet Sprocket and Crash Test Dummies, as well as playing smaller acoustic sets. Jovovich had opted to perform in smaller and more intimate settings, turning down a musical appearance on Saturday Night Live.

The Divine Comedy Tour comprised 3 Legs and 50 Shows in total. The tour began with a small concert at the Borderline in London on 2 January 1994. The 1st leg if followed by twenty-two shows, occurred in North America, at bars and cafes. The 2nd and 3rd legs followed by fourteen shows both, occurred in North America too.

Three singles were released from the album, "Bang Your Head", "It's Your Life" and "Gentleman Who Fell", which charted at No. 21 on the Billboard Modern Rock Tracks chart. Two music videos were produced for it, the first version is shown more like a children's story in color and directed by Lisa Bonet. Milla wasn't pleased with the result and filmed another more artistic one in black and white. "Gentleman Who Fell" appears on the soundtracks for The Leading Man and Rules of Attraction; "It's Your Life" appears on the soundtrack for the Randal Kleiser film It's My Party. Milla also made a tour to support the album. "Bang Your Head" was released in 1994 by SBK.

"The Alien Song" is in the 1993 Richard Linklater film Dazed and Confused. "In a Glade" plays on many of the in-game radios in the Oblivion Lost mod of the game Stalker: Shadow of Chernobyl which takes place in Ukraine.

"The Divine Comedy" is a reference to the epic poem by Dante Alighieri of the same name. It was written between 1308 and his death in 1321, and is widely considered the preeminent work of Italian literature. The poem's imaginative and allegorical vision of the afterlife is a culmination of the medieval world-view as it had developed in the Western Church. It helped establish the Tuscan dialect in which it is written as the standardized Italian. It is divided into three parts, the Inferno, Purgatorio, and Paradiso, like Milla does in her album, the first track "Alien Song" tell's about hell (Inferno). Milla said:
"When I was first working on the sketch for the album cover, my mom introduced me to a young Russian artist named Alexis Steele. I looked at his sketch for the cover and I saw that struggle - all the struggle that I'm singing about. It IS the divine comedy."

Jovovich had chosen the title after seeing Russian artist Alexis Steele's proposed cover artwork sketch for the then untitled album.

Reception

Jovovich had to fight for her rights to have her own music released. While the album was not a commercial success, it was highly praised and well received by critics.

Allmusic gave a favourable review: "the good results of The Divine Comedy are not as common. Produced by Rupert Hine, the album is a low-key, laid-back affair featuring guest appearances by Eric Bazilian and Martha Davis. Milla has a pleasant voice and above-average songwriting ability, and the songs are organic, light, airy concoctions that work well in their understated settings. The jaunty, folk-inflected "Gentlemen Who Fell" was an alternative rock hit. Other noteworthy cuts include the otherworldly "The Alien Song (For Those Who Listen)" and the medieval "Charlie"."

John McAlley of Rolling Stone called the album "remarkable", "strikingly mature and rich in invention", and as featuring "angst-laced poetry with vivid melodies and arrangements that find a common spirit in synth pop, European folk and psychedelic dream rock".

CD Review also gave the album a favourable review: "This waiflike Russian emigre has modeled and made brief appearances in the films Chaplin and Dazed and Confused. She's a decent songwriter with a poetic style (in the Kate Bush vein) and a smoky provocative voice. A wide range of exotic flavors--pipes, panflute, Eastern strings, and chants--make this first effort interesting and different from the onslaught of grrrl rock."

Chicago Tribune gave the album a mixed review and said: "Backed by gently percussive arrangements spiced with unusual instruments like kalimba and harmonium, Milla impressively keeps both her imagery and her import-implying vocals in check; she's more akin to Tanita Tikaram, say, than Tori Amos (or soulmate Martha Davis, who supports Milla on the standout "Gentlemen Who Fell"). She supplies just the right touch of the dark drama suggested by the album's unnecessarily pretentious title, and gives all indications of a bright future."

The Washington Post said: [Milla] "is forever struggling with words and emotions on her debut album The Divine Comedy, forever trying to make sense of love or the lack of it. She never succeeds, of course, but her tenacity is what makes the album worth hearing. Evoking a curious combination of childlike innocence, Harlequin romance and hippie sentimentality, her songs are tone poems of a sort, inspired by vulnerability and wariness, sung in a small, plaintive, unguarded soprano. At times she seems hopelessly lovesick, a prime candidate for any heartbreaker's ruse, but on "You Did It All Before," "Clock," and "Don't Fade Away" she sounds a lot older and wiser, no stranger to hurt and disillusionment."

Let It Rock said: "Milla Jovovich is not only attractive to the eye, but also pleasing to the ear. Her songs take form in fairytale poetry, as if she were some medieval storybook princess, held captive against her will in a Dragon's Lair. Authentic Russian acoustic instruments create a soundscape of delicate beauty, ethereal, yet soulful and heartfelt. An original." Microsoft Music Central said the album: "At times it's all too ethereal for its own good (though the second half is brighter and catchier), or a tad adolescent (she's still only 18). Milla already floats like a butterfly; now she needs to sting like a bee. Better will come."

Accolades

On the 9th anniversary of the album, Slant magazine named Milla's The Divine Comedy to their list of 50 Essential Pop albums, they said: "Though some of the singer's lyrics can err on the loopy side (the songs were written when she was just 15, recorded when she was 16, and released by the time she was legal, which, I suppose, makes this the sole "teen pop" selection on our Vital Pop list), Milla's messages are mostly conveyed through passion, not words, a claim only the finest performers can make. The listener is transported into Milla's medieval faerie land of Russian folk influences and contemporary synth-pop via a series of eclectic yet seamless tracks like the mesmerizing "Charlie" and the dramatic "Don't Fade Away" (produced by Richard Feldman and Rupert Hine, respectively. Feldman's tracks have a more Celtic sound while Hine's are more pop-friendly and otherworldly). Although many were quick to dismiss Milla for attempting to crossover into yet another industry (she has since gone on to headline the Resident Evil film franchise and continues to record music independently), The Divine Comedy stands as one of the best lost pop albums of the '90s."

Track listing

Unreleased tracks
"Gentleman Who Fell" (acoustic)
"Can You Bend Your Back Like This?" (live)
"Come as You Like" (live)
"Falling" (live)
"Precious Time" (live)
"Strange Behavior" (live)

Credits and personnel
Milla Jovovich – main vocals
Chris Brenner – keyboard, mandolin
Bjorn Myers – bass guitar
David Limerick – acoustic and electric guitar
Johna Dean – violin, mandolin, key fiddle

Charts

Release history

References

External links
Live mp3s, Lyrics, Guitar Tabs - MillaJ.com :: Official Website

1994 debut albums
Albums produced by Rupert Hine
Milla Jovovich albums
SBK Records albums